Roques de Benet is a compact group of sheer rocky outcrops in the northwestern side of the Ports de Tortosa-Beseit, Catalonia, Spain. The highest summit (el Castell) has an elevation of 1,017.1 metres above sea level.

The Roques de Benet are one of the Emblematic summits of Catalonia.

See also
Ports de Tortosa-Beseit
List of mountains in Catalonia
Iberian System

References

External links
Roques de Benet - Horta de Sant Joan Tourist Office
Barcelona University - Roques de Benet - Excursion Guide

Ports de Tortosa-Beseit
Rock formations of Catalonia
Mountains of Catalonia
Terra Alta (comarca)